Karas is a divergent Trans–New Guinea language spoken on the biggest of the Karas Islands off the Bomberai Peninsula, that appears to be most closely related to the West Bomberai languages. It is spoken in Antalisa and Mas villages on Karas Island.

Pronouns
Cowan (1953) records the following pronouns for Karas.

Visser (2020) records the following pronouns for Karas of Maas village:

 

The free possessives and possessive suffixes can occur together.

References

Sources 

 
 
 
 Visser, Eline. 2021. Kalamang dictionary. In: Key, Mary Ritchie & Comrie, Bernard (eds.) The Intercontinental Dictionary Series. Leipzig: Max Planck Institute for Evolutionary Anthropology. (CLDF dataset)

 Visser, Eline. 2022. A grammar of Kalamang. (Comprehensive Grammar Library 4). Berlin: Language Science Press. DOI: 10.5281/zenodo.6499927  https://langsci-press.org/catalog/book/344 . Open Access.

External links 
 Timothy Usher, New Guinea World, Kalamang

Languages of western New Guinea
Severely endangered languages
West Bomberai languages